Salvia nutans, nodding sage, is a species of Salvia in the family Lamiaceae, native to Central and Eastern Europe, the Caucasus, and possibly Siberia. It has been introduced into North America as a garden escapee.

References

nutans
Garden plants of Europe
Flora of Central Europe
Flora of Eastern Europe
Flora of Southeastern Europe
Plants described in 1753
Taxa named by Carl Linnaeus